In enzymology, an alpha,alpha-trehalose-phosphate synthase (GDP-forming) is an enzyme that catalyzes the chemical reaction

GDP-glucose + glucose 6-phosphate  GDP + alpha,alpha-trehalose 6-phosphate

Thus, the two substrates of this enzyme are GDP-glucose and glucose 6-phosphate, whereas its two products are GDP and alpha,alpha'-trehalose 6-phosphate.

This enzyme belongs to the family of glycosyltransferases, specifically the hexosyltransferases.  The systematic name of this enzyme class is GDP-glucose:D-glucose-6-phosphate 1-alpha-D-glucosyltransferase. Other names in common use include GDP-glucose-glucose-phosphate glucosyltransferase, guanosine diphosphoglucose-glucose phosphate glucosyltransferase, and trehalose phosphate synthase (GDP-forming).

References 

 

EC 2.4.1
Enzymes of unknown structure